NA-196 Qambar Shahdadkot-I is a newly-created constituency for the National Assembly of Pakistan. It mainly comprises the Qubo Saeed Khan Taluka, Shahdadkot Taluka, Sijawal Junejo Taluka, and Miro Khan Taluka. It was created in the 2018 delimitation after the constituency overlapping between Qambar Shahdadkot District and Larkana District was ended.

Election 2018 

General elections are scheduled to be held on 25 July 2018.

See also
NA-195 Larkana-II
NA-197 Qambar Shahdadkot-II

References 

Qambar Shahdadkot